Shane Smith may refer to:

Shane Smith (drummer) (born 1979), Canadian drummer
Shane Smith (horticulturist), author, lecturer, and director of the Cheyenne Botanic Gardens
Shane Smith (journalist) (born 1969), Canadian journalist and web entrepreneur
Shane Smith (soccer) (born 1985), American soccer player
Shane Smith (American football) (born 1993), American football player

See also
Shayne Smith (disambiguation)